Acacia undoolyana ( common names Sickle-leaf wattle, Undoolya wattle) is a species of wattle native to central Australia.

Description 
Acacia undoolyana is a shrub or small tree growing up to 15 m high and has persistent fissured bark. Both stems and phyllodes  have a covering of minute flattened hairs, when young. The phyllodes are flat, linear to narrowly elliptic, and silvery when young but later a grey-green. They are sickle-shaped, are 120–220 mm long by 5–15 mm wide, and have  a marginal basal gland and a prominent apical gland. They have multiple parallel nerves of which up to three are more prominent. The inflorescence is a yellow cylindrical spike on a hairy peduncle 3–6 mm long. The pods are linear and  50–110 mm long by 2–3 mm wide, and the seeds have a white aril.

It flowers from June to September and fruits from August to December.

Distribution
It is found in the MacDonnell Ranges Bioregion of Central Australia. The main population is on Undoolya station.

Habitat 
It is generally found  on steep south facing slopes  on skeletal soils.

Conservation status 
It is listed as "vulnerable" under both Commonwealth and Territory legislation. The major threat to its survival is frequent bushfires.

References

undoolyana
Plants described in 1988